Labilibaculum filiforme is a psychrotolerant, neutrophilic, halotolerant and motil bacterium from the genus of Labilibaculum which has been isolated from sediments from the Baltic Sea.

References

Bacteria described in 2019
Bacteroidia